Mark Thomas McNally (born 20 July 1989) is a British former professional road and track racing cyclist, who rode professionally between 2009 and 2018 for four different professional teams. He now works as a directeur sportif for UCI Continental team .

Biography
McNally was born in Fazakerley, Liverpool. He took up cycling after watching the 2000 Summer Olympics on television. In November 2014,  announced that McNally would join them for the 2015 season.

Major results

2007
 1st  Team pursuit, UEC European Junior Track Championships
 2nd Individual pursuit, National Junior Track Championships
 5th Road race, UEC European Under-23 Road Championships
2008
 1st  Team pursuit, UEC European Under-23 Track Championships
 2nd Points race, National Track Championships
2009
 3rd Beaumont Trophy
 4th Colne Town Centre Grand Prix
2011
 1st  Overall Mi-Août Bretonne
 2nd Zellik–Galmaarden
 3rd Omloop van het Houtland
 3rd GP Raf Jonckheere
 4th Houtem-Vilvoorde
 6th Omloop Het Nieuwsblad Beloften
 7th Internationale Wielertrofee Jong Maar Moedig
 8th Belsele Individueel
2012
 1st Grote Prijs Beeckman-De Caluwé
 3rd Zellik–Galmaarden
 7th Beverbeek Classic
 7th GP Raf Jonckheere
 8th GP Lanssens Crelan Individueel
 10th Grote Prijs Stad Zottegem
2013
 4th GP Briek Schotte
 5th Grote Prijs Stad Geel
2014
 1st  Mountains classification Tour of Britain
 3rd Rutland–Melton CiCLE Classic
 4th GP Maurice Raes
 5th Baronie Breda Classic
 10th Omloop der Kempen
2015
 1st GP Lucien Van Impe
 3rd Grote Prijs Jef Scherens
 4th London Nocturne
 5th Overall Tour of the Reservoir
 7th Chorley Grand Prix
 7th Leicester Castle Classic
 10th Grote Prijs Stad Zottegem
2016
 2nd Ronde van Drenthe
 4th Road race, National Road Championships
 5th Internationale Wielertrofee Jong Maar Moedig
 10th London–Surrey Classic
2017
 1st  Sprints classification Tour of Britain
 3rd GP Paul Borremans Viane-Geraardsbergen
 10th Ronde van Limburg
2018
 4th Grand Prix d'Isbergues

References

External links

Profile on AnPost website

1989 births
Living people
English male cyclists
People from Fazakerley
English track cyclists
Sportspeople from Liverpool